Mood Changes  is a jazz album by American saxophonist and vocalist Grace Kelly. It was released on May 5, 2009. The tracks "101" and "I Want to Be Happy" were winners of the 2008 ASCAP Young Jazz Composers Award  and the 2008 Downbeat Magazine student music awards. Liner Notes written by LA Times journalist Don Heckman

Track listing

Tracks

 "Happy Theme Song" (5:32)
 "Comes Love" (5:54)
 "Tender Madness" (4:26)
 "101" (6:12)
 "But Life Goes On" (4:00)
 "Ain't No Sunshine" (6:13)
 "Here, There and Everywhere" (6:13)
 "I'll Remember April" (3:17)
 "It Might As Well Be Spring" (5:38)
 "I Want to Be Happy" (4:26)

Personnel
Grace Kelly – alto/soprano/tenor saxophones and vocals
Jason Palmer – trumpet
Doug Johnson – piano
John Lockwood – bass, electric bass
Jordan Perlson – drums (1,3,4,8,9)
Terri Lyne Carrington – drums (2,5,6,7,10)
Adam Rogers – guitar (6,7)
Hal Crook – trombone (10)

References

External links

2009 albums
Grace Kelly (musician) albums